Selma Olivia Jacobson Wigzell (born 11 January 1964) is a Swedish official and former politician. Since 2015 she is director-general of the Swedish National Board of Health and Welfare.

She served as County Council Councilor of Stockholm County between 1994 and 1998, and Municipal Commissioner and Vice mayor of Stockholm Municipality between 1998 and 2000. During both tenures she represented the Swedish Social Democratic Party, but today she is not affiliated with any political party.

After leaving politics Olivia has worked at the Swedish Association of Health Professionals and as secretary in Ansvarskommittén. In April 2007 Olivia was employed by the National Board of Health and Welfare, which she left in 2008 for the job as head of the Division for Public Health and Health Care, at the Ministry of Health and Social Affairs.

In 2014 she took the office as director-general of the Swedish Agency for Health Technology Assessment and Assessment of Social Services. She maintained the office until the following year when she was appointed director-general of the Swedish National Board of Health and Welfare. In 2018 she was named the 4th most influential person in Swedish health policy. 
Between 2015 and 2018 she served as Sweden's representative in the executive board of the World Health Organization. She is chairman of the OECD Health Committee and the board of Örebro University.

References 

Government of Stockholm
21st-century Swedish women politicians
1964 births
Swedish Social Democratic Party politicians
Municipal commissioners of Sweden
Swedish civil servants
Living people